Roman Mann (19 October 1911 — 11 March 1960) was a Polish art director, who worked on more than thirty films including Dead Track (1948). His brother was the artist Kazimierz Mann.

Selected filmography
 Dead Track (1948)
 Warsaw Premiere (1951)

References

Bibliography 
 Haltof, Marek. Polish Film and the Holocaust: Politics and Memory. Berghahn Books, 2012.

External links 
 

1911 births
1960 deaths
Polish art directors
Film people from Lviv